Marion Rolland (born 17 October 1982) is a retired World Cup alpine ski racer from France.

Racing career
Born in Saint-Martin-d'Hères, Isère, she made her World Cup debut in January 2004 and attained her first top-10 in February 2009 in Bansko. She has two World Cup podium finishes, both at the finals at Schladming in March 2012.

After making her first Olympic team in 2010, Rolland took a tumble in the downhill only four seconds from the starting gate at Whistler.  She has competed for France in three World Championships, in 2009, 2011 and 2013. Without a podium in the 2013 season, Rolland won the downhill world title at Schladming for her first career win.

Rolland injured her knee ligaments whilst in pre-season training in Chile before the 2013-14 season, which prevented her from competing at the 2014 Winter Olympics in Sochi and from defending her World Championship title at the 2015 Worlds in Beaver Creek. She subsequently announced her retirement from competition in February 2015.

World Cup top ten finishes
 2 podiums – (1 DH, 1 SG)

Season standings

References

External links
 
 Marion Rolland World Cup standings at the International Ski Federation
 
 
 marionrolland.com personal site 
  
 

1982 births
Living people
French female alpine skiers
Olympic alpine skiers of France
Alpine skiers at the 2010 Winter Olympics
People from Saint-Martin-d'Hères
Sportspeople from Isère